(born 1981) is  the associate coach of the Osaka Evessa in the Japanese B.League.

Head coaching record

|-
| style="text-align:left;"|Iwate Big Bulls
| style="text-align:left;"|2012
| 26||12||14|||| style="text-align:center;"|7th in Eastern|||-||-||-||
| style="text-align:center;"|- 
|- 
| style="text-align:left;"|Chiba Jets
| style="text-align:left;"|2012-13
| 52||26||26|||| style="text-align:center;"|6th in Eastern|||3||1||2||
| style="text-align:center;"|Lost in 1st round 
|- 
| style="text-align:left;"|Kumamoto Volters
| style="text-align:left;"|2014
| 2||0||2|||| style="text-align:center;"|Fired|||-||-||-||
| style="text-align:center;"|- 
|-

References

1981 births
Living people
Alvark Tokyo coaches
Chiba Jets Funabashi coaches
Iwate Big Bulls coaches
Japanese basketball coaches
Kumamoto Volters coaches
Nippon Tornadoes coaches
Osaka Evessa coaches